Gustav Johansson (born May 2, 1999) is a Swedish cyclist specializing in track cycling.

Personal life
Johansson was raised in Glommen, Sweden. He currently lives in Mallorca.

Career
He will compete in 2022 for Team Ormsalva-Bianchi. Johansson has also competed in road cycling, and took ninth place in the Swedish Championships in Uppsala 2020.

Major results
Sources:
2020
 9th Road race, National Road Championships

Gallery

References

1999 births
Living people
Swedish male cyclists
20th-century Swedish people

External links
 Gustav Johanssons website.